Pragya Academy is a Junior College, established in 2010, and located in Jorhat of Assam, India.

Pragya Academy is a co-educational institution, in a self-contained campus with all necessary infrastructural facilities. It is situated at Baruah Chariali, in the heart of the city Jorhat. This institution is run by a society, named Pragya Academy Society registered under the Society Act of 1860.
Pragya  Academy  is a Junior College of Science stream, recognized by the Assam Higher Secondary Education Council.

Academics
The Academy provide two year higher secondary course in science stream under Assam Higher Secondary Education Council.
The Academy not only concentrates on the higher secondary syllabus but also prepares the students for various state level and all India entrance examinations for the graduate professional courses like JEE (Mains & Advanced), AIIMS, NEET, NEST, Assam CEE etc.

Achievement
Within few years from establishment, the college emerged as a pioneer institution of the entire region. The college came to lime light in 2016 when one student named Vaishali Dutta secured 10th position in the higher secondary examination conducted by AHSEC.

In the same year, 79 students out of 85 secured distinction in the hs finals, while 21 students cracked the JEE mains exam.

In 2018, two students Sudarshan Singh Sandhu & Pragya Priya Borah got 5th and 7th position in AHSEC '18. Also 73 students out of 94 passed with distinction; 7 got star and rest 14 are passed with 1st division.

References

Schools in Assam
Jorhat
Junior colleges in India
Educational institutions established in 2010
2010 establishments in Assam